László Fonó (born 9 April 1981) is a Hungarian former professional tennis player. He is now a coach.

Fonó, a national doubles champion, was born in Budapest and represented the Hungary Davis Cup team in a five ties during the 2003 edition. He lost his only singles rubber to Lamine Ouahab but was unbeaten in four doubles outings. 

On the professional tour he attained a best singles world ranking of 608 and ranked as high as 407 in doubles.

ITF Futures finals

Singles: 1 (0–1)

Doubles: 4 (2–2)

See also
List of Hungary Davis Cup team representatives

References

External links
 
 
 

1981 births
Living people
Hungarian male tennis players
Tennis players from Budapest